A police code is a brevity code, usually numerical or alphanumerical, used to transmit information between law enforcement over police radio systems. Examples of police codes include "10 codes" (such as 10-4 for "okay" or "acknowledged"—sometimes written X4 or X-4), signals, incident codes, response codes, or other status codes. These code types may be used in the same sentence to describe specific aspects of a situation. 

Codes vary by state, county, and agency. It is rare to find two agencies with exactly the same ten-codes, signals, incident codes, or other status codes. While agencies with adjacent or overlapping jurisdictions often have similar codes, it is not uncommon to find differences even within one county or city. Different agencies can have codes dissimilar enough to make communication difficult. There are similarities among popular sets of 10-codes.   

The topic of standardized codes has long been discussed in U.S. law enforcement circles, but there is no consensus on the issue. Some law enforcement agencies use “plain talk” or “plain language” which replaces codes with standard speech and terminology, albeit in a structured manner or format. Arguments against plain language is its lack of brevity, variability, and lack of secrecy that is often tactically advantageous or a safety issue when officer communications can be overheard by the civilian public.

Examples

California
The Hundred Code is a three digit police code system. This code is usually pronounced digit-by-digit, using a radio alphabet for any letters, as 505 "five zero five" or 207A "two zero seven Alpha". The following codes are used in California. They are from the California Penal Code except where noted below.

In the 1970s, the television show Adam-12 was considered so authentic in its portrayal of Los Angeles PD officers and their procedures that excerpts from the shows were used as police training films around the country.  This led to widespread use of California Penal Codes as radio codes.

"500" codes are only radio codes that substitute for other code sections. For example, a "503" is not Penal Code section 503 (embezzlement). All of the "500" codes, generally, involve vehicles and are thus grouped together (except 594, which is an actual Penal Code section). Additionally, "390" and variants are also radio codes only (CPC 647(f) is the legally enforced section "public intoxication").

In California, some radio codes in the 400–599 range that refer to vehicle violations are left over from the California Vehicle Code (CVC) which was revised in 1971.  Some agencies, such as the California Highway Patrol (CHP) use the current vehicle code numbers while municipal and county police agencies, especially the Los Angeles Police Department (LAPD) still use the 500 series.

See also
 Emergency service response codes
 APCO phonetic alphabet
ICAO spelling alphabet
Ten-code

References and notes

External links 
 
 

Law enforcement
Encodings